Noordpeene is a commune in the Nord department, Hauts-de-France, France.

The small river Peene Becque flows through the village.

Heraldry

See also
Communes of the Nord department

References

External links 
 Official website of Noordpeene

Communes of Nord (French department)
French Flanders